Aitbaar is a 1985 Hindi film directed by Mukul Anand. It stars Raj Babbar, Dimple Kapadia, Suresh Oberoi, Danny Denzongpa, Sharat Saxena in pivotal roles. It was a remake of Alfred Hitchcock's 1954 thriller Dial M For Murder. It was further remade in Tamil in 1985 as Saavi and in Malayalam in 1989 as New Year.

The film's music is by Bappi Lahiri with lyrics by Hasan Kamaal and Farooq Kaiser, who gave "Kisi Nazar Ko Tera Intezar Aaj Bhi Hai", a memorable ghazal duet by Asha Bhosle and Bhupinder Singh. The film was classified A by the censor board.

Plot
The film opens with Jaydeep meeting Vikramjeet on a rainy night and inviting him to his house for drinks. During their conversation, Jaydeep recounts how his wife, Neha, is having an affair with Sagar, the story is entirely a ruse to convince Vikramjeet to help Jaydeep in exacting revenge on his wife. On receiving refusal, Jaydeep blackmails Vikramjeet with a photo of him disposing off a dead body and his knowledge of various aliases maintained to peddle drugs. Vikramjeet agrees for a sum of INR 1,00,000.

The murder plot is hatched, on a weekend night when Jaydeep and Sagar will be away at a party, Vikramjeet has to enter the house stealthily and wait in the drawing room until Jaydeep telephones Neha; Neha has to come to the drawing room to pick up the telephone and Vikramjeet has to strangle her and leave. However, the plan falls apart when Neha kills Vikramjeet in self-defense.

Jaydeep reaches home and doctors the crime scene to frame Neha, who is shocked and vulnerable. The Public Prosecutor proves her guilt and she is sentenced to prison. However, Inspector Barua senses foul play and investigates for the truth to be revealed.

The truth being that Neha never had an affair with Sagar. Both of them were in a relationship before her marriage and reconnected after years as friends. Jaydeep had married Neha for her wealth, and concocted the murder plan to frame Neha and gain unfettered access to her wealth.

When exposed, Jaydeep kills himself and Neha is proven innocent.

Difference from the original
The film differs in some aspects Hitchcock's story, in the original story, when Tony Wendice realises he has been found to be guilty, he accepts his crime gracefully whereas in the Hindi adaptation, Jaydeep commits suicide.

Cast
 Raj Babbar as Jaydeep
 Dimple Kapadia as Neha 
 Suresh Oberoi as Sagar
 Danny Denzongpa as Inspector Barua
 Sharat Saxena as Vikramjeet "Vicky"
 Anupam Kher as Public Prosecutor

Soundtrack
The music for all the songs were composed by Bappi Lahiri.

References

External links
 
 Movie Review

1985 films
1980s Hindi-language films
1980s crime thriller films
Indian crime thriller films
Films directed by Mukul S. Anand
Films scored by Bappi Lahiri
Hindi films remade in other languages
Indian remakes of American films